Venum is a French manufacturer of apparel and equipment for various martial arts, combat sports, and fitness including mixed martial arts, boxing, Brazilian jiu-jitsu, Muay Thai and karate. Venum operates in several areas around the world including America, Europe, and Asia. Venum became the official outfitting partner of the UFC in 2021.

History 
Venum was created in 2006 by Franck Dupuis and Andre Vieira.

Partnership with UFC 
On July 10th, 2020 it was announced that Venum would become the official outfitting partner of the UFC, replacing Reebok.

Venum Training Camp 
Venum Training Camp has three primary locations across the globe: Paris (FRA), Pattaya (THA), and Las Vegas (USA).

Historic fighters, trainers, and coaches
Other sponsored athletes include: 

Jorge Linares
Vasyl Lomachenko
Callum Smith
Giorgio Petrosyan
Sitthichai Sitsongpeenong
Jordan Burroughs
Kyle Dake
Kyle Snyder
J’den Cox
Bo Nickal
Pat Downey
Kurt Angle
Lyoto Machida
Carlos Condit
José Aldo
Miesha Tate
Mauricio Rua
Wanderlei Silva
Fabrício Werdum
Martin Kampmann
Jim Miller
Brad Pickett
Mehdi Zatout
Alaverdi Ramazanov
Nabil Anane
Adam Noi
Sajad Sattari
 Reza Goodary
Pat Downey 
John Gogan
Zehra Doğan

See also
Mixed martial arts clothing

References

External links 

Clothing companies of France
Sporting goods manufacturers of France
Sportswear brands
2006 establishments in France
French brands